Derek Norman Crookes (born 5 March 1969) is a former South African cricketer who played 32 One Day Internationals for South Africa between 1994 and 2000. In domestic cricket he played for Natal, Gauteng, Easterns and the Highveld Lions.

He was educated at Hilton College.

His father, Norman Crookes, was an off-spinning all-rounder who played for Natal in the 1960s and toured England with the South African team in 1965, but did not play a Test.

References

External links
 

1969 births
Living people
People from eThekwini Metropolitan Municipality
South African cricketers
South Africa One Day International cricketers
Alumni of Hilton College (South Africa)
KwaZulu-Natal cricketers
Gauteng cricketers
Easterns cricketers
Lions cricketers
Cricketers at the 1998 Commonwealth Games
Commonwealth Games gold medallists for South Africa
Commonwealth Games medallists in cricket
Medallists at the 1998 Commonwealth Games